Exitfilm is an Estonian movie studio established in 1992  that produces and distributes feature films, short films and documentaries.

Exitfilm's international co-productions include Lilja 4-Ever by Lukas Moodysson (Sweden), Unforgettable by Anders Rønnow Karlund (Denmark)  and Rothschild’s Violin by Edgardo Cozarinsky (France).

On the list of Estonian feature films produced would be the Shop of Dreams in 2005 co-produced with Finland, directed by Peeter Urbla, one of the founders of Exitfilm.Agent Wild Duck (2002) co-produced with Zentropa in Denmark, was directed by Marko Raat.

References 

Film production companies of Estonia
Mass media companies established in 1992
Estonian companies established in 1992
Mass media in Tallinn